The seventh season of the Thai reality television show, The Voice Thailand premiered on November 19, 2018, on PPTV and LINE TV. The show was hosted by Songsit Rungnopphakhunsi on PPTV and LINE TV.

Teams
Color key

 Nutprawe & Khrongkwan originally were solo artist but Pop Pongkool chose both of them to advance as a duo in the Battles.

Blind auditions
The Voice of Thailand Season 7 has added a new rule in the Blind Audition to the Blocked Button, which is a button that can block the chair coaches do not turn to choose the same contestant. The contestants will not be able to select the coach that has blocked the chair. This rule was created to create a rut for the coach.

Color key

Episode 1 (November 19) 

Coaches' Performance - คนไม่เข้าตา

Episode 2 (November 26)

Episode 3 (December 3)

Episode 4 (December 10)

Episode 5 (December 17)

Episode 6 (December 24)

The Knockouts

Color key:

The Battles

  – Artist won the Battles and advanced to the Live Playoffs
  – Artist lost the Battles and was eliminated

Live shows

Episode 13 & 14 : The Playoffs (February 18 & 25)
  Artist advanced to the Final by the Public's votes
  Artist was eliminated

Episode 15 : Final (March 4)

References

External links 
 
 
 
 
 

The Voice Thailand
2018 Thai television seasons
2019 Thai television seasons